Orchard Village, formerly known as the Mardyke Estate, is a housing development in the South Hornchurch area of London, England.

From 2009 to 2017 the site underwent regeneration as part of the London Riverside part of the Thames Gateway. The estate was transferred from Havering London Borough Council to Old Ford Housing Association in March 2008 and redevelopment work started in November 2009. Most of the existing housing, including a number of high rise blocks and flats, were demolished.

History

Mardyke Estate
The original estate was built by Wates Ltd for Hornchurch Urban District Council on land that was previously the Mardyke Farm. The Mardyke is a minor tributary of the River Thames in Thurrock. The  site was built in the 1960s, primarily for workers at the Ford Dagenham automobile construction plant which it borders. It was on the A1306 close to the A13. The estate is not served by any Tube lines, with Dagenham Heathway being the nearest tube station, and Dagenham Dock being the nearest railway station. The 365 bus route had numerous stops within the estate. 

The estate included a number of maisonettes, low-rise flats, and six high-rise buildings, each 38 m tall and consisting of 13 floors. They were named Chantry House, Dearsley House, Mardyke House, Perry House, Roman House and Templar House. There were 490 housing units for rent and 57 leasehold properties. The estate lacked private space and the juxtapositions of bedsits and maisonettes was not popular. Havering Council transferred the estate to Old Ford Housing Association, which is part of the Circle Anglia Group.

Orchard Village development
Orchard Village is a development that created 555 new homes, comprising 339 general needs, 64 shared ownership and 152 private sale properties. There are also local shops and a new primary care facility. The architect was PRP Architects.

The proposal was passed by Havering Council to the Mayor of London's Office on 26 January 2009. It was considered and not refused, but comments were made that it did not comply with the London plan. In particular: London Plan policies on housing, children’s playspace, urban design, access and equal opportunities, biodiversity, climate change mitigation and adaptation, transport and flood risk. The plan was revised, alterations made and resubmitted.
The scheme of works included improvement to an open space adjacent to the estate. It was financed with £31.2m of public money in the form of a grant from the Homes and Communities Agency and administered by the Office of the Mayor Of London (GLA).

The scheme was built in three phases. Phase 1 and Phase 2 were mainly social housing, let to the displaced tenants from the original Mardyke Estate. The builder, Willmott Dixon, claimed “the successful completion of phases one and two” and that phase two “was declared best social or affordable new housing development of the year in the Local Authority Building Control Excellence awards” 

Phase 3 was a development of shared ownership affordable properties. There are 87 units (homes): 29 for affordable rent, 28 shared ownership and 30 for sale. The builder was again Wilmott Dixon.

The name Orchard Village reflects the previous use of part of the land as an orchard supplying fruit to Wilkin & Sons.

Construction issues
Since its construction, Orchard Village has been beset with problems of build quality and estate management which have been widely reported in the media, in particular by The Romford Recorder. 

In late 2015 onwards, residents who purchased affordable homes from Circle Housing, as either freeholders or shared ownership leaseholders, complained of numerous build quality issues including continual leaks, thermal discomfort, electrical faults and high bills. In early 2016 many residents discovered that homes were not insulated and began a process to complain to the authorities involved, Havering Building Control, Circle Housing, the HCA and Mayor of London's office. It was discovered that the Energy Performance Certificates bore no relation to the energy bills from a "locked in" supplier. On average, home owners are experiencing 3-5 more in costs to the EPCs. Many of the residents are awaiting insulation to be installed into their homes. Gardens are not draining, killing the grass.
There has been back flowing of raw sewage into the shower trays and the kitchens. There is a stench from hydrogen sulphide and dangerously high levels of methane, gases that cause migraine and respiratory diseases. It is proposed that these are leaking from the nearby landfill site.

Residents have been angered by the HCA and GLA's refusal to examine evidence of resident's exposure to Cat 1 Hazards such as mould and damp, leaving vulnerable individuals, such as disabled children, hospitalised. Circle's poor management has been exposed and widely reported in the press, with residents citing long delays in repairs.

Transport
The estate is served by the 365 bus. Bus blinds were altered from Mardyke Estate to Orchard Village in 2013. It is operated by Stagecoach East London.

Media
The former estate was the setting of the 2009 film Fish Tank. The domestic shots in the 2010 film Made in Dagenham were taken on the estate, and the demolition of the tower blocks was postponed to facilitate filming.

References
Notes

Bibliography

Investigations launched into safety of Orchard Village estate

External links
Orchard Village

Havering Council: Mardyke Estate redevelopment

Housing estates in London
Buildings and structures in the London Borough of Havering